Mike Gentile (born 1974) is a U.S. soccer player.

Mike Gentile may also refer to:
Mike Gentile, guitarist for the American pop punk band Hey Monday